The Chinese Ambassador to Togo is the official representative of the People's Republic of China to the Togolese Republic.

List of representatives

See also
China–Togo relations

References 

Togo
China